Meadowbank, previously Meadow Bank, is a former rural municipality in the Canadian province of Prince Edward Island within Queens County.

History 
The Municipality of Meadow Bank was originally incorporated on December 31, 1974. It incorporated as a rural municipality on January 1, 2018. On September 1, 2020, the Rural Municipality of Meadowbank amalgamated with the rural municipalities of Afton, Bonshaw, New Haven-Riverdale, and West River. The amalgamated municipality was named the Rural Municipality of West River.

Geography 
The locality of Meadow Bank is within Meadowbank.

See also 
List of communities in Prince Edward Island

References 

Communities in Queens County, Prince Edward Island
Former rural municipalities in Prince Edward Island